Fujie Eguchi (江口 冨士枝, Eguchi Fujie; 18 November 1932 in Nagasaki – 28 May 2021) was an international table tennis player from Japan.

Table tennis career
From 1954 to 1959 she won many medals in singles, doubles, and team events in the Asian Table Tennis Championships, and in the World Table Tennis Championships.

The sixteen World Championship medals included six gold medals; one in the singles at the 1957 World Table Tennis Championships, three in the team event and two in the mixed doubles with Ichiro Ogimura.

She also won three English Open titles.

See also
 List of table tennis players
 List of World Table Tennis Championships medalists

References

1932 births
2021 deaths
People from Nagasaki
Japanese female table tennis players
Asian Games medalists in table tennis
Table tennis players at the 1958 Asian Games
Asian Games gold medalists for Japan
Asian Games bronze medalists for Japan
Medalists at the 1958 Asian Games
20th-century Japanese women